Housing starts is an economic indicator that reflects the number of privately owned new houses (technically housing units) on which construction has been started in a given period. These data are divided into three types: single-family houses, townhouses or small condos, and apartment buildings with five or more units.

Each apartment unit is considered a single start. The construction of a 30-unit apartment building is counted as 30 housing starts.

External links
 United States Census Bureau
 US Relationship Between Building Permits, Housing Starts, and Housing Completions
 Housing Starts at NYU
 UK National Statistics
 Historical US housing starts – monthly data since 1959

Housing